Padenodes cuprizona is a moth of the family Erebidae. It was described by George Hampson in 1914. It is found on New Guinea and Australia.

References

Nudariina
Moths described in 1914